The Pro Basketball League (PBL) Rising Star is an annual Pro Basketball League (PBL) award given to the best young player in the top tier domestic basketball league in Belgium. Formerly, the award was named the PBL Most Promising Player of the Year. Maxime De Zeeuw was the inaugural winner in 2009.

Winners

Awards by club

Notes

References

Basketball League Belgium Division I awards